The Armed Forces Institute of Cardiology (or AFIC) also known as the National Institute of Heart Diseases or NIHD is a government and military cardiac hospital located in Rawalpindi Cantonment, Punjab, Pakistan. This 800-bed cardiac health care institute is a major institute and hospital in Pakistan. The hospital delivers heart disease and health care services to people of Pakistan Armed Forces and fellow citizens of Pakistan.

History 
According to history pages, this institute started operating in 1970. The Pakistan Army Cardiac Service started in 1953 in Cardiothoracic Centre Rawalpindi. The first angiography was done in 1969 and the first open heart surgery was done in 1970. In 1978, the Cardiothoracic Centre Rawalpindi was upgraded as Armed Forces Institute of Cardiology. 3 years after in 1981, the hospital extended their services to all Pakistani Citizens and upgraded to National Institute of Heart Diseases under the President of Pakistan's directions.

Before Malala Yousafzai was airlifted to Queen Elizabeth Hospital Birmingham in England for international treatment, she had been cared for by Pakistani and visiting British doctors at the Institute. She had been flown there from the Combined Military Hospital Peshawar, where she had been taken from the District Hospital in Swat.

Departments and Units 
The hospital is divided into the following departments and units.

Units 
 Coronary Care Unit, 19 beds
 Surgical ITC, 19 beds

Departments 
 Department of Echocardiography
 Department of Exercise Tolerance Test
 Department of Nuclear Cardiology
 Departments of Cardiac Electrophysiology

References 

Hospitals in Rawalpindi
Military medical facilities in Pakistan